Martin Davies may refer to:

Martin Davies (museum director) (1908–1975), British museum director and civil servant
Martin Davies (law professor) (born 1957), professor of maritime law
Martin Davies (writer) (born 1965), British author
Martin Davies (footballer) (born 1974), Welsh footballer
Martin Davies (philosopher) (born 1949), British philosopher

See also
Martin Davis (disambiguation)